L'Épiphanie was a parish municipality in the Lanaudière region of Quebec, Canada, part of the L'Assomption Regional County Municipality.

On May 23, 2018, the parish ceased to exist when it was merged into the Town of L'Épiphanie.

Demographics
Population trend:
 Population in 2011: 3296 (2006 to 2011 population change: 5.3%)
 Population in 2006: 3129
 Population in 2001: 2931
 Population in 1996: 2739
 Population in 1991: 2421

Private dwellings occupied by usual residents: 1,212 (total dwellings: 1,307)

Mother tongue:
 English as first language: 0%
 French as first language: 96.5%
 English and French as first language: 1%
 Other as first language: 2.5%

Education

The Sir Wilfrid Laurier School Board operates anglophone public schools, including:
 Joliette Elementary School in Saint-Charles-Borromée

References

Populated places in Lanaudière
Former municipalities in Quebec